Hayk Melikyan (born November 29, 1980 in Yerevan) is an Armenian pianist and composer. He is widely known as one of the best performers of 20th century and contemporary classical music.

Life and career 
Melikyan was born in Yerevan. He is the grandson of renowned poet, translator and publicist Sokrat Khanyan.

Melikyan's two recent solo albums were released by NAXOS Grand Piano label: complete piano solo compositions of Arno Babadjanian and Alexander Arutiunian.

In 2013, he performed in Germany with Karine Gilanyan in dedication of the then upcoming 100th anniversary of the Armenian genocide.

Melikyan regularly performs on prestigious stages of the world including Gulbenkian Grand Auditorium (Lisbon), Victoria Hall (Geneva), Aram Khachaturian Grand Concert Hall (Yerevan), etc.

In 2009, Hayk Melikyan initiated «1900+» World Piano Music Concerts Series of the 20th Century and Contemporary Music.

Awards
 IBLA Grand Prize International Piano Competition: Special prize (Ragusa, Italy, 1999).
 Valentino Bucchi International Piano Competition of Twentieth Century and Contemporary Music: 2nd prize (Rome, Italy,  2000).
 Yvar Mikhashoff Trust for New Music (Buffalo, United States, 2012).
 Orléans International Piano Competition: Samson François prize (Orléans, France, 2008).
 Lazar Saryan Composers Competition: 1st prize (Yerevan, Armenia, 2008).
 Orléans International Piano Competition: André Boucourechliev prize (Orléans, France, 2012).
 Gold Medal of Moscow Composers Union: for his contribution and promotion of the World Contemporary Music (Moscow, Russia, 2012). 
 Honorary Artist of Armenia (2013).
 Hayk Melikyan's solo album «Arutiuanian: Complete Piano Works» by NAXOS Grand Piano label was selected as The Best Classical Music Album of the Year within the Swallow Music Awards (2018).

Quotes
 Barry Brenesal (Fanfare Magazine):
Hayk Melikyan has power and agility to spare, with plenty of attention to inner voicings. He is never at a loss for style or direction in any of this music, which is pretty impressive when you consider that it really represents two very different styles.

References

Links
 Official Website
 Hayk Melikyan at the Armenian National Music website
 NAXOS E-Card
 

Armenian classical pianists
Living people
Musicians from Yerevan
1980 births
Armenian composers
21st-century classical pianists